
Kurt Singer (May 12, 1886 – February 14, 1962) was a German economist and philosopher.

Born in Magdeburg, he was a professor at Hamburg University (1924-1933). He taught at the Tokyo Imperial University from 1931 to 1935.

Singer died at Athens at the age of 75.

Literary works 
 On the crisis of present-day Japan, 1932
 Das Geld als Zeichen, 1920
 Platon und das Griechentum, 1920
 Platon der Gründer, 1927

Further information
 Schönhärl, Korinna. (2007). Die Ökonomen des George-Kreises zwischen Historischer Methode und Ökonometrie 1918-1933: der Ökonom Kurt Singer und die Methode der Semiotik, Zeitschrift für Bibliothek, Archiv und Information in Norddeutschland, Nordhausen: Bautz, ISSN 0720-7123, ZDB-ID 8020310, Vol. 27.2007, 4, 

German economists
German expatriates in Japan
German expatriates in Greece
Writers from Magdeburg
People from the Province of Saxony
1886 births
1962 deaths
German male non-fiction writers
20th-century German philosophers